Gimnée is a village in Wallonia and a district of the municipality of Doische, located in the province of Namur, Belgium.

The settlement is traceable back to a Roman villa which was founded here during Gallo-Roman times. In the Middle Ages, it was part of the holdings of the lords of Hierges. The current village church dates from 1770.

References

External links

Populated places in Namur (province)